The 2016 Four Continents Figure Skating Championships was an international figure skating competition in the 2015–16 season. It was held at the Taipei Arena in Taipei, Taiwan on February 16–21. Medals were awarded in the disciplines of men's singles, ladies' singles, pair skating, and ice dancing.

Qualification
The competition was open to skaters from non-European member nations of the International Skating Union who reached the age of 15 before 1 July 2015. The corresponding competition for European skaters was the 2016 European Figure Skating Championships.

National associations selected their entries based on their own criteria but the ISU mandated that their selections achieve a minimum technical elements score (TES) at an international event prior to the Four Continents.

Minimum TES

Entries
The ISU published the list of entries on 28 January 2016. Some national associations announced their selections earlier.

 On 15 January 2016, Mao Asada withdrew from the event to focus on Worlds. She was replaced by Kanako Murakami.
 On 26 January 2016, Ashley Wagner withdrew from the event to focus on Worlds. She was replaced by Mirai Nagasu.
 On 4 February 2016, it was announced that Adam Rippon had withdrawn from the event to focus on Worlds. He was replaced by Ross Miner.
 On 11 February 2016, Skate Canada announced that Gabrielle Daleman and Julianne Séguin / Charlie Bilodeau had withdrawn from the event as a precaution – Daleman and Séguin having sustained minor injuries in practice – and would be replaced by Véronik Mallet and Vanessa Grenier / Maxime Deschamps, respectively.
 On 12 February 2016, Polina Edmunds withdrew from the event "due to lack of time to break in my new skates." She was replaced by Karen Chen.
 On 20 February 2016, Meagan Duhamel / Eric Radford withdrew before the free skating due to Duhamel's illness.

Results

Men

Ladies

Pairs

Ice dancing

Medals summary

Medalists
Medals for overall placement:

Small medals for placement in the short segment:

Small medals for placement in the free segment:

Medals by country
Table of medals for overall placement:

Table of small medals for placement in the short segment:

Table of small medals for placement in the free segment:

Prize money
Prize money is awarded to skaters who achieve a top 12 placement in each discipline as follows:

References

External links
 
 2016 Four Continents at the International Skating Union
http://www.isuresults.com/results/season1516/fc2016/index.htm

Four Continents Figure Skating Championships
Four Continents Figure Skating Championships, 2016
Sports competitions in Taipei
February 2016 sports events in Asia
International figure skating competitions hosted by Taiwan